"Love Plus One" is a 1982 single by the British new wave band Haircut One Hundred from their debut album Pelican West.  It was the band's biggest hit in their native UK, where it reached No. 3 and was certified gold by the BPI for sales in excess of 400,000 copies.

Release and reception
The single was released in the UK in January 1982, entering the UK Singles Chart at No. 36 and quickly moving up to No. 12 two weeks later, eventually reaching No. 3. It stayed in the top 40 for a total of 11 weeks. It was Single of the Week in Smash Hits, where Ian Birch described the song as "a nifty mover with plenty of interesting details" and predicted it would become an even bigger hit than "Favourite Shirts (Boy Meets Girl)". The single was the band's only hit in the United States, where it peaked at No. 37 on the Billboard Hot 100 chart. The song ranked at No. 90 on VH1's 100 Greatest One Hit Wonders of the 1980s.

Track listing

UK release
 7" single (Arista CLIP2)
 "Love Plus One" – 3:35
 "Marine Boy" – 3:33
Timings are not stated on the UK release although are specified on certain overseas releases.

 12" single (Arista CLIP121)
 "Love Plus One" – 5:39
 "Marine Boy" – 4:56

US release
 7" single (Arista AS 0672)
 "Love Plus One" – 3:35
 "Favourite Shirts (Boy Meets Girl)" – 3:04

In other media
The song was featured in a restaurant scene in the 1995 thriller film Se7en, in the 2007 comedy movie Knocked Up, and in the Glee 2013 episode "I Do" as characters Kurt and Tina are arguing on the dance floor.

The song is also used in the 2013 film Grown Ups 2 in the scene where the family are preparing to go to an 1980s themed party.

Charts

Weekly charts

Year-end charts

References

1981 songs
1982 singles
Haircut One Hundred songs
Arista Records singles
Songs written by Nick Heyward
Song recordings produced by Bob Sargeant